Elections to Armagh City and District Council were held on 5 May 2011 on the same day as the other Northern Irish local government elections. The election used four district electoral areas to elect a total of 22 councillors.

Election results

Note: "Votes" are the first preference votes.

Districts summary

|- class="unsortable" align="centre"
!rowspan=2 align="left"|Ward
! % 
!Cllrs
! % 
!Cllrs
! %
!Cllrs
! %
!Cllrs
! % 
!Cllrs
!rowspan=2|TotalCllrs
|- class="unsortable" align="center"
!colspan=2 bgcolor="" | UUP
!colspan=2 bgcolor="" | Sinn Féin
!colspan=2 bgcolor="" | SDLP
!colspan=2 bgcolor="" | DUP
!colspan=2 bgcolor="white"| Others
|-
|align="left"|Armagh City
|16.8
|1
|bgcolor="#008800"|45.1
|bgcolor="#008800"|3
|25.1
|1
|13.0
|1
|0.0
|0
|6
|-
|align="left"|Crossmore
|14.4
|1
|34.5
|2
|bgcolor="#99FF66"|38.5
|bgcolor="#99FF66"|2
|12.7
|0
|0.0
|0
|5
|-
|align="left"|Cusher
|bgcolor="40BFF5"|42.5
|bgcolor="40BFF5"|2
|7.6
|0
|10.6
|1
|24.5
|2
|14.8
|1
|6
|-
|align="left"|The Orchard
|31.1
|2
|19.6
|1
|15.1
|1
|bgcolor="#D46A4C"|31.9
|bgcolor="#D46A4C"|1
|2.3
|0
|5
|- class="unsortable" class="sortbottom" style="background:#C9C9C9"
|align="left"| Total
|27.6
|6
|24.8
|6
|21.3
|5
|21.1
|4
|5.2
|1
|22
|-
|}

District results

Armagh City

2005: 2 x Sinn Féin, 2 x SDLP, 1 x UUP, 1 x DUP
2011: 3 x Sinn Féin, 1 x SDLP, 1 x UUP, 1 x DUP
2005-2011 Change: Sinn Féin gain from SDLP

Crossmore

2005: 2 x SDLP, 2 x Sinn Féin, 1 x DUP
2011: 2 x SDLP, 2 x Sinn Féin, 1 x UUP
2005-2011 Change: UUP gain from DUP

Cusher

2005: 3 x DUP, 2 x UUP, 1 x SDLP
2011: 2 x UUP, 2 x DUP, 1 x SDLP, 1 x Independent
2005-2011 Change: Independent gain from DUP

The Orchard

2005: 2 x UUP, 1 x DUP, 1 x Sinn Féin, 1 x SDLP
2011: 2 x UUP, 1 x DUP, 1 x Sinn Féin, 1 x SDLP
2005-2011 Change: No change

References

Armagh City and District Council elections
Armagh